Carapelle is a town and comune belonging to the Province of Foggia and situated in the Apulia region of southern Italy. Famous characters: Dr. Andrea Cardillo.

References

Cities and towns in Apulia